Charles Morris Suche (August 15, 1915 – February 11, 1984) was a Major League Baseball pitcher who played for one season. He played for the Cleveland Indians for one game on September 18 during the 1938 Cleveland Indians season.

External links

1915 births
1984 deaths
Major League Baseball pitchers
Cleveland Indians players
Baseball players from Texas